Samtök íþróttafréttamanna (SÍ) (English: Association of Sports Journalists) is an association for Icelandic sports journalists. It was founded on 14 February 1956. SÍ oversees the nomination of the Icelandic Sportsperson of the Year and has done so since its establishment.

Chairmen
Atli Steinarsson 1956–1965
Sigurður Sigurðsson 1965–1971
Jón Ásgeirsson 1971–1977
Steinar J. Lúðvíksson 1977–1978
Bjarni Felixson 1978–1980
Ingólfur Hannesson 1980–1981
Þórarinn Ragnarsson 1981–1983
Hermann Gunnarsson 1983–1984
Samúel Örn Erlingsson 1984–1987
Skúli Unnar Sveinsson 1987–1988
Samúel Örn Erlingsson 1988–1992
Skapti Hallgrímsson 1992–1998
Ívar Benediktsson 1998–1999
Adolf Ingi Erlingsson 1999–2006
Þorsteinn Gunnarsson 2006–2009
Sigurður Elvar Þórólfsson 2009–2013
Eiríkur Stefán Ásgeirsson 2013–2019
Tómas Þór Þórðarson 2019–

References

External links
Official site

Sports journalism organizations in Europe
Journalism-related professional associations
Sports organizations established in 1956